The Cowboy and the Blonde is a 1941 American Western comedy film directed by Ray McCarey and released by 20th Century Fox.

Cast
 Mary Beth Hughes as Crystal Wayne
 George Montgomery as Lank Garrett
 Alan Mowbray as Phineas Johnson

External links
 

1941 films
1940s English-language films
1940s Western (genre) comedy films
American Western (genre) comedy films
20th Century Fox films
American black-and-white films
1941 comedy films
Films directed by Ray McCarey
1940s American films